A number of steamships have been named Arsterturm, including:

, a cargo ship in service 1911–19
, a cargo ship in service 1944–45
, a cargo ship in service 1956–69

Ship names